East Berlin is a section of the town of Berlin in Hartford County, Connecticut, United States. Its zip code is 06023.

External links
  Sacred Heart Church

Neighborhoods in Connecticut
Berlin, Connecticut